Nicolas Berthelot (born 1964) is a French sports shooter and Olympic medalist. He won silver medal in the 10 metre air rifle at the 1988 Summer Olympics in Seoul.

References

External links

1964 births
Living people
French male sport shooters
Shooters at the 1984 Summer Olympics
Shooters at the 1988 Summer Olympics
Olympic shooters of France
Olympic silver medalists for France
Olympic medalists in shooting
Medalists at the 1988 Summer Olympics
20th-century French people